Magda Foy (July 13, 1905 – February 2, 2000), also known and often credited as "The Solax Kid", was a child actor in the silent film era who worked for Solax Studio, the largest pre-Hollywood studio in the United States from 1910 to 1913.

Biographical information
Magda Foy was born on July 13, 1905, in Manhattan, New York to Mary and Patrick Foy as Magdelena Patricia Foy. She died on February 2, 2000, in Port Jefferson, New York.

Career
Foy, along with her parents, was a member of the Solax stock company and she appeared in 23 of the studio's films. She often was directed by Alice Guy-Blaché, the founder of Solax and its artistic director. Foy played the lead in A Child's Sacrifice (1910), the first film produced by Solax. She was cast in leading and minor roles, and portrayed both girls and boys. Her last film, Man's Woman (1917), made independent of Solax Studios, was directed by Travers Vale.

One of Foy's better known roles was that of Little Trixie Thompson, the lead character in Falling Leaves. The film cast Magda as a young girl who, overhearing the doctor say that her elder sister will die of tuberculosis before the last leaf falls, determines to save her by tying the leaves onto the trees outside their home.

Filmography

A Child's Sacrifice (1910)
Grandmother's Love (1911): Little Girl
Only a Squaw (1911): Little Mary
The Will of Providence (1911): The Waif
The Little Kiddie Mine (1911): Toots
Baby’s Choice (1911): Baby
Christmas Presents (1911): Widow Johnston's Daughter
God Disposes (1912): Little Gladys Knight
Sealed Lips (1912): The Smiths' Child
Falling Leaves (1912): Trixie Thompson
Child of the Tenements (1912): The Martins' Child
The Detective's Dog (1912): Kitty Harper
The Sewer (1912): Oliver
Fra Diavolo (1912): Uncredited
The Glory of Light (1912): Blind Man's Daughter
Just a Boy (1912): Shorty
The Reformation of Mary (1912): Frances Van Brunt
The Strike (1912): The Little Girl
Treasures on the Wing (1912): The Browns' Daughter
The Love of the Flag (1912): The Draftsman's Son
The Coming Sunbeam (1913): Sunbeam
Blood and Water (1913): The Granddaughter
A Child's Intuition (1913): Louise Wade
Man's Woman (1917): Young Girl

References

External links

1905 births
2000 deaths
20th-century American actresses
American child actresses
American silent film actresses